= Church of Jesus of Nazareth, Gegrėnai =

Church in Lithuania

Gegrėnai Jesus of Nazareth church
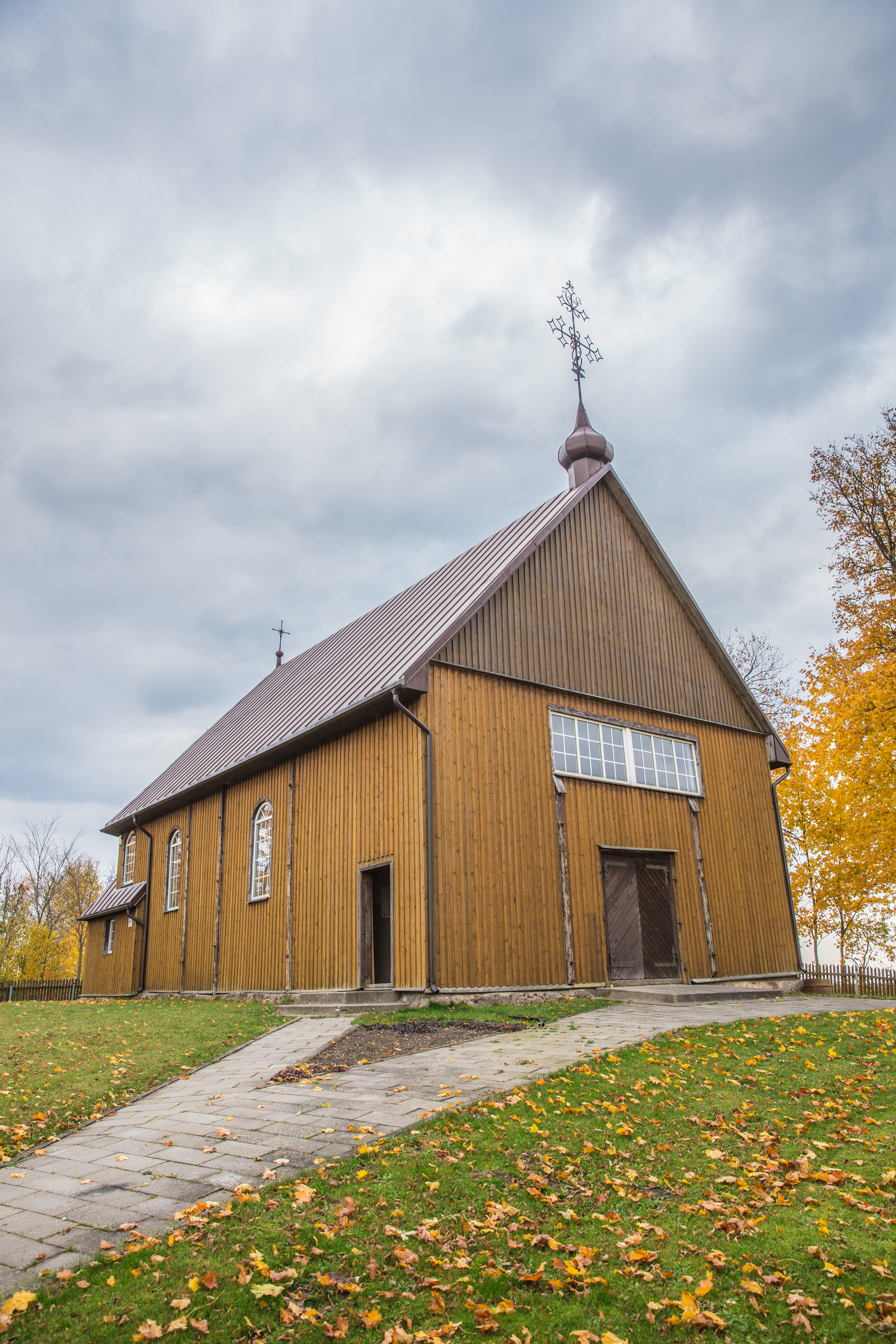
- Interactive map of the Gegrėnai Jesus of Nazareth church area

General information
- Location: Gegrėnai, Lithuania
- Coordinates: 56.099640°N 21.922983°E

Website
- www.

The Gegrėnai Jesus of Nazareth wooden church was built in 1754, on the private land of the noble Węsławski family. Since the church was initially built for the family of Michał Węsławski, the building was not large (19.9 x 12.7 metres). At the beginning of the 19th century, the church was rebuilt in the same place and in an identical shape. On the front dome, a metal sun-shaped cross with the Węsławski family crest was raised.

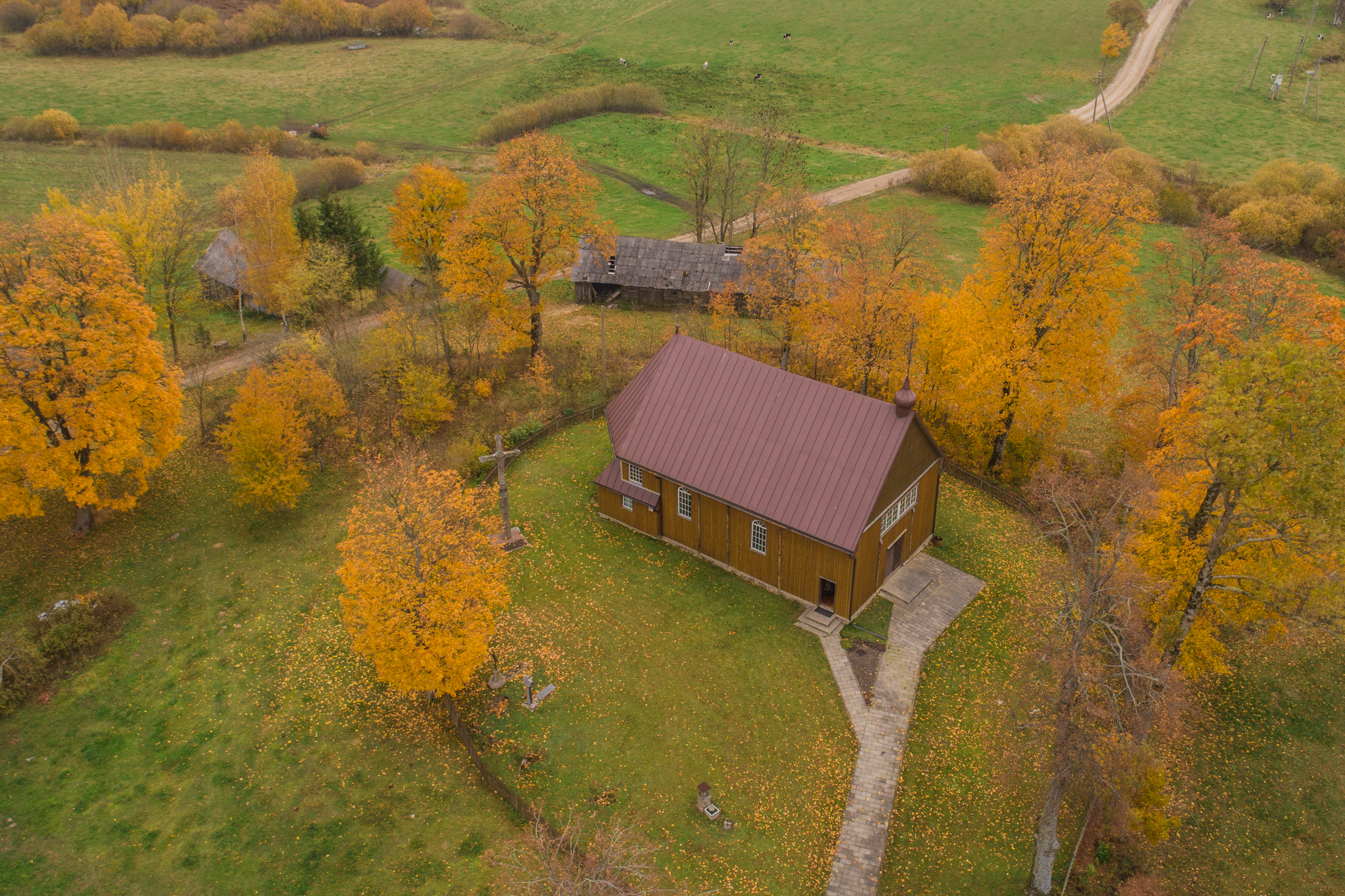

== Architecture ==
The Gegrėnai Jesus of Nazareth wooden church belongs to the archaic type of sacral architecture. It has a rectangular layout with three wall apses and a sacristy on the right-hand side. In 1850, a second sacristy was built that was symmetrical to the first. The facades are tower-less, while the rectangular windows are finished with semi-circular arches. An original and rare interior feature of this church the apse facing a small box of pews for the church sponsors.

Even though the church has been renovated many times, its main structure and the interior space have not changed much. From the written resources, it can even be concluded that the present-day altar differs very slightly from the very first altar in the church. The great altar of the church is valued not only due to its authenticity, but also because of the framed statue of Jesus of Nazareth in its niche. The statue is unique and is famed for its miracles. In the past, it would be dressed in fabric clothing depending on the liturgical period of the year. Both the exterior and the interior of the church are modest. The most important features are the three wooden baroque altars that have remained in the church since it was built.

== History ==
In 1882, a bell tower was built in the churchyard, and in 1888 a clergy house was constructed nearby. The Holy Brotherhood of the Sacrament and the Apostleship of Prayer were organised close to the church, along with a branch of the Lithuanian Women’s Society. In 1940, Gegrėnai parish was established. In the after-war period, a priest no longer resided in Gegrėnai due to a decrease of the population.

== Gallery ==
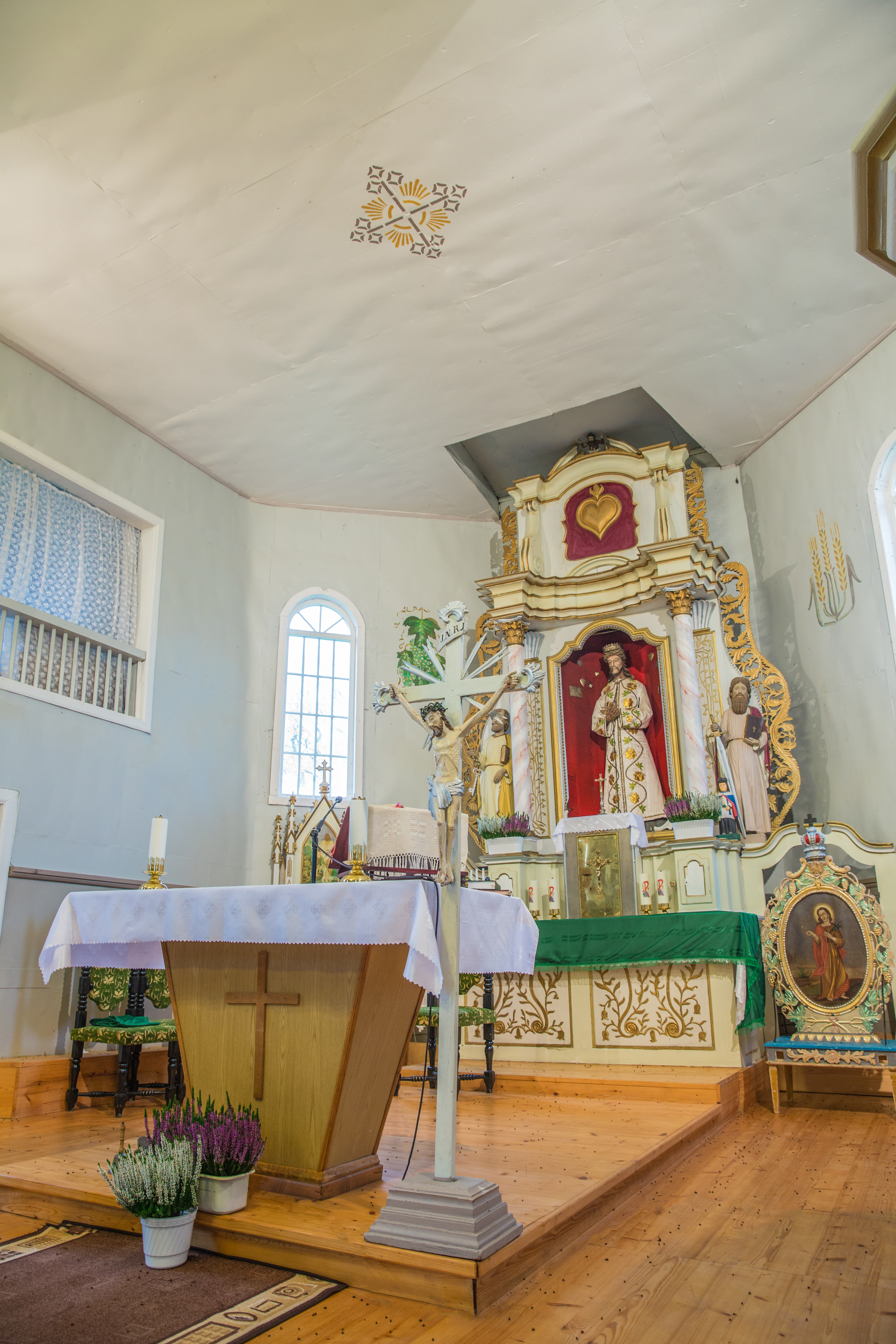

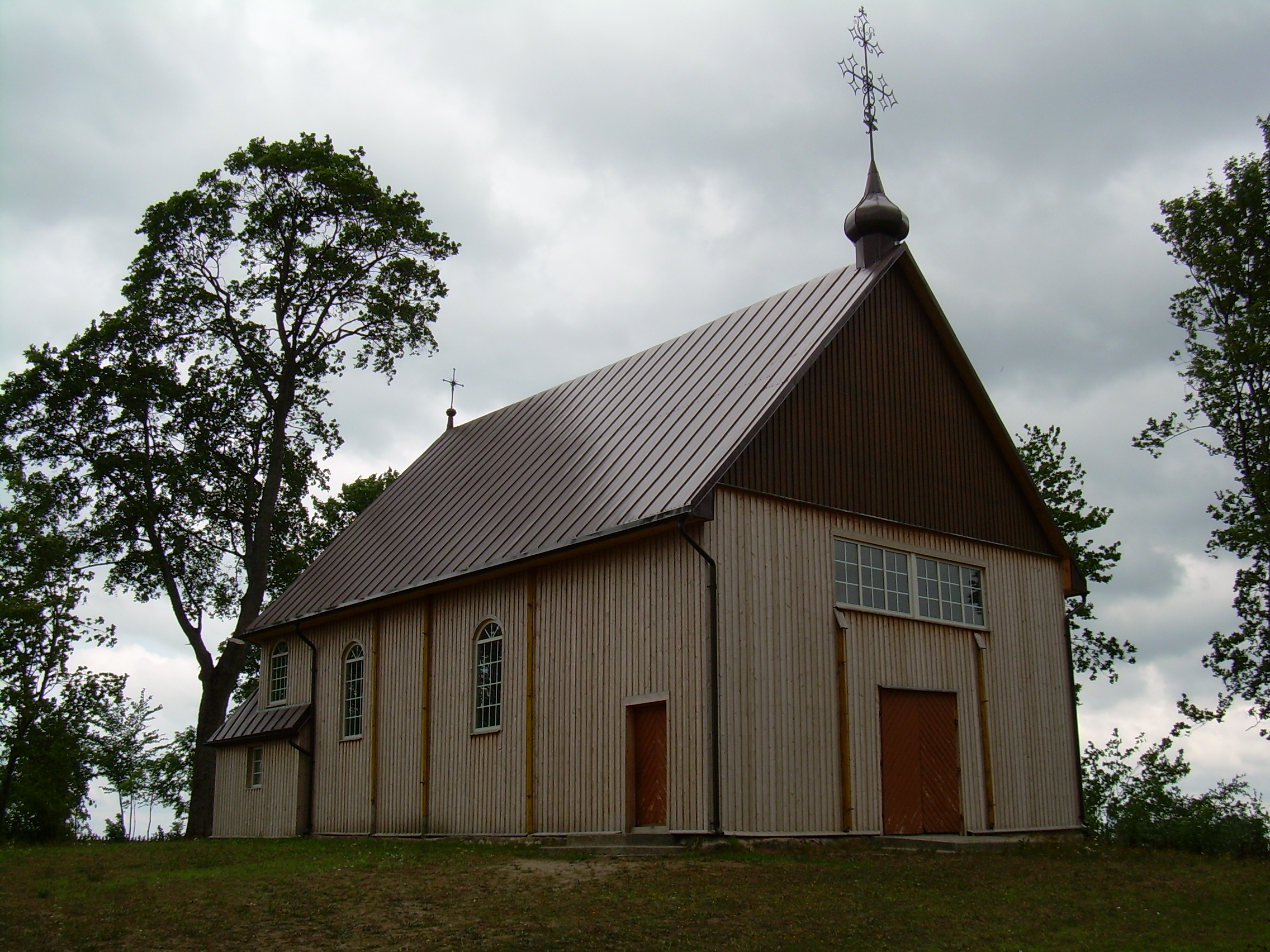

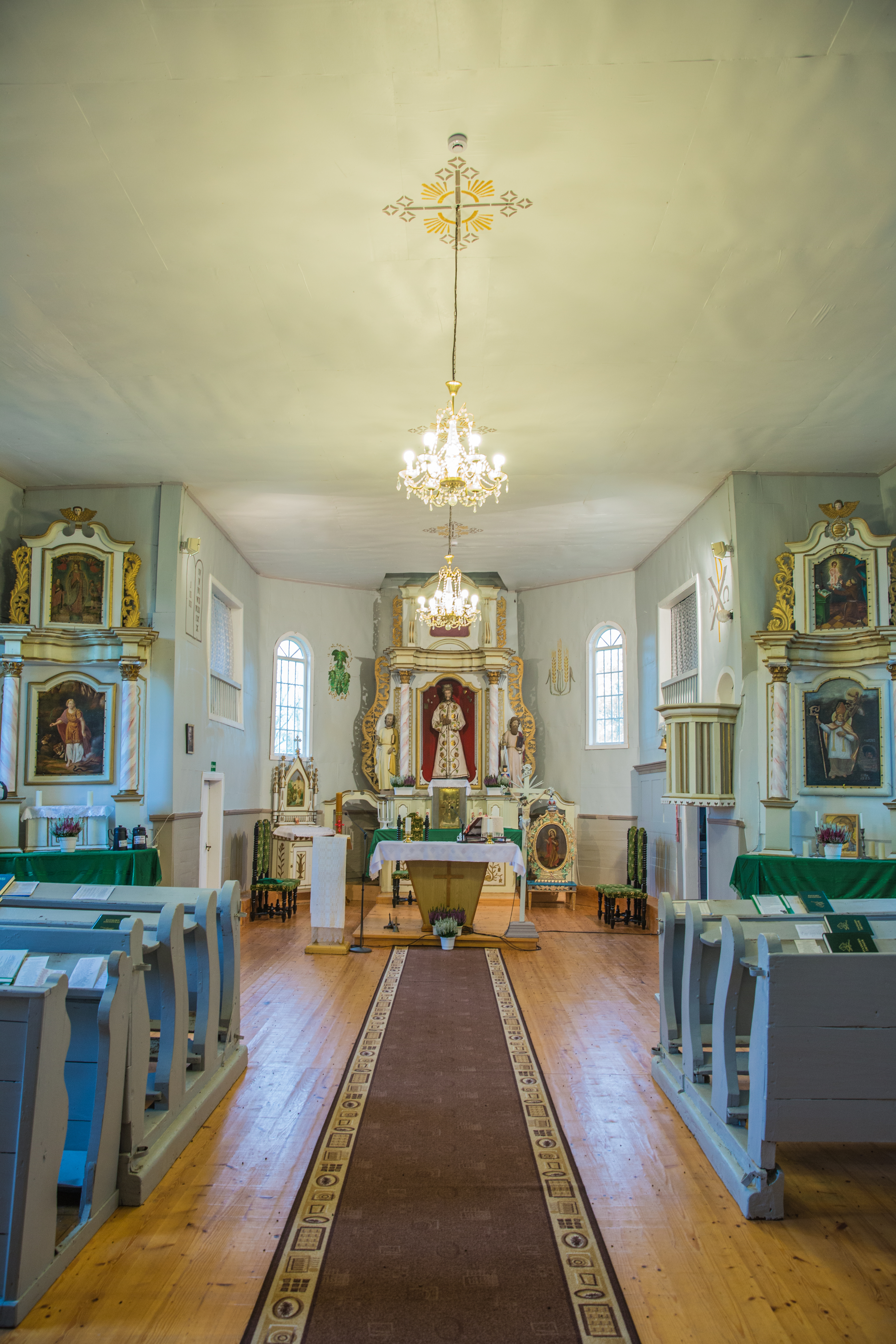

== Bibliography ==
- Wołkanowski, Waldemar (2015). Michał Węsławski. Biografia prezydenta Wilna w latach 1905-1916 [Michał Węsławski. Biography of the President of Vilnius in 1905-1916] (in Polish). Opole.
